Ballycomisk Ringforts are three ringforts (raths) forming a National Monument located in County Tipperary, Ireland.

Location

Ballycomisk Ringforts are located 4.2 km (2.7 mi) southeast of Cashel.

Description

There is one large rath 66 m (218 ft) in diameter, and to the south of it two more raths which are largely obliterated by modern farming.

References

Archaeological sites in County Tipperary
National Monuments in County Tipperary